Falsimohnia anderssoni is a species of sea snail, a marine gastropod mollusk in the family Buccinidae.

References

 Kantor Yu.I. & Harasewych M.G. (2013) Antarctica, where turrids and whelks converge: A revision of Falsimohnia Powell, 1951 (Neogastropoda: Buccinoidea) and a description of a new genus. The Nautilus 127(2): 43-56

anderssoni